Abies vejarii is a species of fir native to northeastern Mexico, in the states of Coahuila, Nuevo León, and Tamaulipas, where it grows at high altitudes (2,000–3,300 m) in the Sierra Madre Oriental.

Description
It is a medium-sized evergreen tree growing to 35–40 m tall. The leaves are needle-like, moderately flattened, 1–2.5 cm long and 1.3–2 mm wide by 1 mm thick, grey-green with scattered stomata above, and with two greenish-white bands of stomata below. The tip of the leaf is acutely pointed. The cones are glaucous purple, maturing grey-brown, 6–15 cm long and 4–6 cm broad, with about 150–200 scales, each scale with a bract of which the apical 3–8 mm is exserted on the closed cone, and two winged seeds; they disintegrate when mature to release the seeds.

Range and habitat
Abies vejarii grows on steep mountain slopes near the summits and in cool ravines of the Sierra Madre Oriental, from 1,900 to 3,300 meters elevation. The climate is cool with wet winters and drier summers. It grows on soils typically moist but low in humus content. It is most often associated with pines and Mexican Douglas-fir (Pseudotsuga menziesii var. lindleyana), along with oaks, Cupressus arizonica, and Picea engelmannii subsp. mexicana.

Subspecies
Three subspecies are recognized:
 Abies vejarii var. macrocarpa Martínez
 Abies vejarii var. mexicana (Martínez) T.S.Liu
 Abies vejarii var. vejarii

Name
The species was first described in 1942. It was named after Octavio Véjar Vázquez, Mexican Minister for Public Education at the time.

References

A Handbook of the World's Conifers by Altos Farjon

External links
Trees and Shrubs Online
Conifer Database

vejarii
Least concern plants
Trees of Northeastern Mexico
Flora of the Sierra Madre Oriental
Taxonomy articles created by Polbot